From the 12th century onwards, a group of Normans invaded and settled in Gaelic Ireland. These settlers later became known as Norman Irish or Hiberno-Normans. They originated mainly among Cambro-Norman families in Wales and Anglo-Normans from England, who were loyal to the Kingdom of England, and the English state supported their claims to territory in the various realms then comprising Ireland. During the High Middle Ages and Late Middle Ages the Hiberno-Normans constituted a feudal aristocracy and merchant oligarchy, known as the Lordship of Ireland. In Ireland, the Normans were also closely associated with the Gregorian Reform of the Catholic Church in Ireland. Over time the descendants of the 12th-century Norman settlers spread throughout Ireland and around the world, as part of the Irish diaspora; they ceased, in most cases, to identify as Norman, Cambro-Norman or Anglo-Norman.

The dominance of the Norman Irish declined during the 16th century, after a new English Protestant elite settled in Ireland during the Tudor period. Some of the Norman Irishoften known as The Old Englishhad become Gaelicised by merging culturally and intermarrying with the Gaels, under the denominator of "Irish Catholic". Conversely, some Hiberno-Normans assimilated into the new English Protestant elite, as the Anglo-Irish.

Some of the most prominent Norman families were the FitzMaurices, FitzGeralds, Burkes (de Burghs), Butlers, Fitzsimmons and Wall family. One of the most common Irish surnames, Walsh, derives from the Normans based in Wales who arrived in Ireland as part of this group.

Etymology

Historians disagree about what to call the Normans in Ireland at different times in its existence, and in how to define this community's sense of collective identity.

In his book Surnames of Ireland, Irish historian Edward MacLysaght makes a distinction between Hiberno-Norman and Anglo-Norman surnames. This sums up the fundamental difference between "Queen's English Rebels" and the Loyal Lieges. The Geraldines of Desmond or the Burkes of Connacht, for instance, could not accurately be described as Old English, for that was not their political and cultural world. The Butlers of Ormond, on the other hand, could not accurately be described as Hiberno-Norman in their political outlook and alliances, especially after they married into the royal family.

Some historians now refer to them as Cambro-Normans – Seán Duffy of Trinity College Dublin, invariably uses that term. After many centuries in Ireland and just a century in Wales or England it appears odd that their entire history since 1169 is known by the description Old English, which only came into use in the late 16th century. Some contend it is ahistorical to trace a single Old English community back to 1169, for the real Old English community was a product of the late sixteenth century in the Pale. Up to that time the identity of such people had been much more fluid; it was the administration's policies which created an oppositional and clearly defined Old English community.

He argued in a lecture to the Mícheál Ó Cléirigh Institute in University College, Dublin that the poets referred in that way to hibernicised people of Norman stock in order to grant them a longer vintage in Ireland than the ( meaning means 'fair-haired foreigners', i.e. Norwegian Vikings;  meaning 'black-haired foreigners', i.e. Danish Vikings).

"Old English" vs. New English
The term Old English (meaning 'old foreigners') began to be applied by scholars for Norman-descended residents of The Pale and Irish towns after the mid-16th century, who became increasingly opposed to the Protestant "New English" who arrived in Ireland after the Tudor conquest of Ireland in the 16th and 17th centuries. Many of the Old English were dispossessed in the political and religious conflicts of the 16th and 17th centuries, largely due to their continued adherence to the Roman Catholic religion. As a result, those loyal to Catholicism attempted to replace the distinction between "Norman" and "Gaelic Irish" under the new denominator of Irish Catholic by 1700, as they were both barred from positions of wealth and power by the so-called New English settlers, who became known as the Protestant Ascendancy.

The earliest known reference to the term "Old English" is in the 1580s. The community of Norman descent prior to then used numerous epithets to describe themselves (such as "Englishmen born in Ireland" or "English-Irish"), but it was only as a result of the political cess crisis of the 1580s that a group identifying itself as the Old English community actually emerged.

History

Normans in medieval Ireland

Traditionally, London-based Anglo-Norman governments expected the Normans in the Lordship of Ireland to promote the interests of the Kingdom of England, through the use of the English language (despite the fact that they spoke Norman-French rather than English), law, trade, currency, social customs, and farming methods. The Norman community in Ireland was, however, never monolithic. In some areas, especially in the Pale around Dublin, and in relatively urbanised communities in Kilkenny, Limerick, Cork and south Wexford, people spoke the English language (though sometimes in arcane local dialects such as Yola), used English law, and in some respects lived in a manner similar to that found in England.

However, in the provinces, the Normans in Ireland ( meaning "foreigners") were at times indistinguishable from the surrounding Gaelic lords and chieftains. Dynasties such as the Fitzgeralds, Butlers, Burkes, and Walls adopted the native language, legal system, and other customs such as fostering and intermarriage with the Gaelic Irish and the patronage of Irish poetry and music. Such people became regarded as "more Irish than the Irish themselves" as a result of this process (see also History of Ireland (1169–1536)). The most accurate name for the community throughout the late medieval period was Hiberno-Norman, a name which captures the distinctive blended culture which this community created and within which it operated. In an effort to halt the ongoing Gaelicisation of the Anglo-Norman community, the Irish Parliament passed the Statutes of Kilkenny in 1367, which among other things banned the use of the Irish language, the wearing of Irish clothes, as well as prohibiting the Gaelic Irish from living within walled towns.

The Pale
Despite these efforts, by 1515, one official lamented, that "all the common people of the said half counties [of The Pale] that obeyeth the King's laws, for the most part be of Irish birth, of Irish habit, and of Irish language." English administrators such as Fynes Moryson, writing in the last years of the sixteenth century, shared the latter view of what he termed the English-Irish: "the English Irish and the very citizens (excepting those of Dublin where the lord deputy resides) though they could speak English as well as we, yet commonly speak Irish among themselves, and were hardly induced by our familiar conversation to speak English with us". Moryson's views on the cultural fluidity of the so-called English Pale were echoed by other commentators such as Richard Stanihurst who, while protesting the Englishness of the Palesmen in 1577, opined that "Irish was universally gaggled in the English Pale".

Beyond the Pale, the term 'English', if and when it was applied, referred to a thin layer of landowners and nobility, who ruled over Gaelic Irish freeholders and tenants. The division between the Pale and the rest of Ireland was therefore in reality not rigid or impermeable, but rather one of gradual cultural and economic differences across wide areas. Consequently, the English identity expressed by representatives of the Pale when writing in English to the English Crown often contrasted radically with their cultural affinities and kinship ties to the Gaelic world around them, and this difference between their cultural reality and their expressed identity is a central reason for later Old English support of Roman Catholicism.

There was no religious division in medieval Ireland, beyond the requirement that English-born prelates should run the Irish church. After the Henrician Reformation of the 1530s, however, most of the pre-16th century inhabitants of Ireland continued their allegiance to Roman Catholicism, even after the establishment of the Protestant Church of England, and its Irish counterpart, the Church of Ireland.

Tudor conquest and arrival of New English

In contrast to previous English settlers, the New English, that wave of settlers who came to Ireland from England during the Elizabethan era onwards as a result of the Tudor conquest of Ireland, were more self-consciously English, and were largely (though not entirely) Protestant. To the New English, many of the Old English were "degenerate", having adopted Irish customs as well as choosing to adhere to Roman Catholicism after the Crown's official split with Rome. The poet Edmund Spenser was one of the chief advocates of this view. He argued in A View on the Present State of Ireland (1595) that a failure to conquer Ireland fully in the past had led previous generations of English settlers to become corrupted by the native Irish culture. In the course of the 16th century, the religious division had the effect of alienating the Old English from the state, and eventually propelled them into making common cause with the Gaelic Irish as Irish Roman Catholics.

Cess crisis
The first confrontation between the Old English and the English government in Ireland came with the cess crisis of 1556–1583. During that period, the Pale community resisted paying for the English army sent to Ireland to put down a string of revolts which culminated in the Desmond Rebellions (1569–1573 and 1579–1583). The term "Old English" was coined at this time, as the Pale community emphasised their English identity and loyalty to the Crown, while, at the same time, contradictorily they refused to co-operate with the wishes of the English Crown as represented in Ireland by the Lord Deputy of Ireland.

Originally, the conflict was a civil issue, as the Palesmen objected to paying new taxes that had not first been approved by them in the Parliament of Ireland. The dispute, however, also soon took on a religious dimension, especially after 1570, when Elizabeth I of England was excommunicated by Pope Pius V's papal bull . In response, Elizabeth banned the Jesuits from her realms as they were seen as being among the Papacy's most radical agents of the Counter-Reformation which, among other aims, sought to topple her from her thrones. Rebels such as James Fitzmaurice Fitzgerald portrayed their rebellion as a "Holy War", and indeed received money and troops from the papal coffers. In the Second Desmond Rebellion (1579–1583), a prominent Pale lord, James Eustace, Viscount of Baltinglass, joined the rebels from religious motivation. Before the rebellion was over, several hundred Old English Palesmen had been arrested and sentenced to death, either for outright rebellion, or because they were suspected rebels because of their religious views. Most were eventually pardoned after paying fines of up to 100 pounds, a very large sum for the time. However, twenty landed gentlemen from some of the Pale's leading Old English families were executed; some of them "died in the manner of [Roman] Catholic martyrs, proclaiming they were suffering for their religious beliefs".

This episode marked an important break between the Pale and the English regime in Ireland, and between the Old English and the New English.

In the subsequent Nine Years' War (1594–1603), the Pale and the Old English towns remained loyal in favour of outward loyalty to the English Crown during another rebellion.

Establishment of Protestantism
In the end, however, it was the re-organisation of the English government's administration in Ireland along Protestant lines in the early 17th century that eventually severed the main political ties between the Old English and England itself, particularly following the Gunpowder Plot in 1605.

First, in 1609, Roman Catholics were banned from holding public office in Ireland. Then, in 1613, the constituencies of the Irish Parliament were changed so that the New English Anglicans would have a slight majority in the Irish House of Commons. Thirdly, in the 1630s, many members of the Old English landowning class were forced to confirm the ancient title to their land-holdings often in the absence of title deeds, which resulted in some having to pay substantial fines to retain their property, while others ended up losing some or all of their land in this complex legal process (see Plantations of Ireland).

The political response of the Old English community was to appeal directly to the King of Ireland in England, over the heads of his representatives in Dublin, effectively meaning that they had to appeal to their sovereign in his role as King of England, a necessity which further disgruntled them.

First from James I, and then from his son and successor, Charles I, they sought a package of reforms, known as The Graces, which included provisions for religious toleration and civil equality for Roman Catholics in return for their payment of increased taxes. On several occasions in the 1620s and 1630s, however, after they had agreed to pay the higher taxes to the Crown, they found that the Monarch or his Irish viceroy chose instead to defer some of the agreed concessions. This was to prove culturally counterproductive for the cause of the English administration in Ireland, as it led to Old English writers, such as Geoffrey Keating to argue (as Keating did in Foras Feasa ar Éirinn (1634)), that the true identity of the Old English was now Roman Catholic and Irish, rather than English. English policy thus hastened the assimilation of the Old English with the native Irish.

Dispossession and defeat

In 1641, many of the Old English community made a decisive break with their past as loyal subjects by joining the Irish Rebellion of 1641. Many factors influenced the decision of the Old English to join in the rebellion; among these were fear of the rebels and fear of government reprisals against all Roman Catholics. The main long-term reason was, however, a desire to reverse the anti-Roman Catholic policies that had been pursued by the English authorities over the previous 40 years in carrying out their administration of Ireland. Nevertheless, despite their formation of an Irish government in Confederate Ireland, the Old English identity was still an important division within the Irish Roman Catholic community. During the Irish Confederate Wars (1641–1653), the Old English were often accused by the Gaelic Irish of being too ready to sign a treaty with Charles I of England at the expense of the interests of Irish landowners and the Roman Catholic religion. The ensuing Cromwellian conquest of Ireland (1649–1653), saw the ultimate defeat of the Roman Catholic cause and the almost wholesale dispossession of the Old English nobility. While this cause was briefly revived before the Williamite war in Ireland (1689–1691), by 1700, the Anglican descendants of the New English had become the dominant class in the country, along with the Old English families (and men of Gaelic origin such as William Conolly) who chose to comply with the new realities by conforming to the Established Church.

Protestant Ascendancy
In the course of the eighteenth century under the Protestant Ascendancy, social divisions were defined almost solely in sectarian terms of Roman Catholic, Anglican and Protestant Nonconformist, rather than ethnic ones. Against the backdrop of the Penal Laws which discriminated against them both, and a country becoming increasingly Anglicized, the old distinction between Old English and Gaelic Irish Roman Catholics gradually faded away,

Changing religion, or rather conforming to the State Church, was always an option for any of the King of Ireland's subjects, and an open avenue to inclusion in the officially recognised "body politic", and, indeed, many Old English such as Edmund Burke were newly-conforming Anglicans who retained a certain sympathy and understanding for the difficult position of Roman Catholics, as Burke did in his parliamentary career. Others in the gentry such as the Viscounts Dillon and the Lords Dunsany belonged to Old English families who had originally undergone a religious conversion from Rome to Canterbury to save their lands and titles. Some members of the Old English who had thus gained membership in the Irish Ascendancy even became adherents of the cause of Irish independence. Whereas the Old English FitzGerald Dukes of Leinster held the premier title in the Irish House of Lords when it was abolished in 1800, a scion of that Ascendancy family, the Irish nationalist Lord Edward Fitzgerald, was a brother of the second duke.

Norman surnames in Ireland

The following is a list of Hiberno-Norman surnames, many of them unique to Ireland. For example, the prefix "Fitz", meaning "son of", in surnames like FitzGerald appears most frequently in Hiberno-Norman surnames (cf. modern French fils de with the same meaning). However, a few names with the prefix "Fitz-" sound Norman but are actually of native Gaelic origin; Fitzpatrick was the surname Brian Mac Giolla Phádraig had to take as part of his submission to Henry VIII in 1537, and FitzDermot was Mac Gilla Mo-Cholmóc of the Uí Dúnchada sept of the Uí Dúnlainge based at Lyons Hill, County Dublin).

 Barrett
 Barry 
 Bennett
 Blake
 Blanchfield
 Bodkin
 Browne
 Bruce
 Burke and Bourke (deriving from de Burgh/de Búrca/de Burgo)
 Butler
 Curtis
 D'Alton
 D'Arcy
 Cogan 
 Clare 
 Candon
 Cantillon
 Colbert
 Costello
 Cusack 
 Lacy
 Delaney
 Dillon
 Devereux
 Deane
 English
 Fagan
 Fanning
 Fay
 Finglas
 FitzGerald
 FitzGibbons
 FitzHenry
 FitzMaurice
 FitzRalph
 Fitzrichard
 FitzRoy
 FitzSimons
 FitzStephen
 FitzWilliam
 French 
 Gault 
 Goggin
 Grace
 Hussey 
Hand
Harris
Harpur
 Hore 
Jordan
 Joyce 
 Lawless
 Lambart 
 Lambert
 Grace
 Lovett 
 Mansell
 Marmion
 Marren
 Martin
 Mansfield
 Bissett
 Mee 
 Mohan 
 Nagle
 Nangle
 Neville
 Nicolas
 Nugent
 Payne
 Peppard
 Perrin
 Petitt
 Plunkett
 Power 
 Prendergast
 Preston
 Purcell 
 Redmond
 Tuite
 Roach
 Rochford 
 Rossiter 
 Russell 
 St. Leger
 Savage
 Seagrave
 Shortall
 Sinnott
 Stack
 Taaffe
 Talbot
 Testard 
 Tyrrell
 Troy
 Tobin
 Wall  
 Walsh 
 Warren
 Wolfe 
 White

Hiberno-Norman texts
The annals of Ireland make a distinction between Gaill and Sasanaigh. The former were split into Fionnghaill or Dubhghaill, depending upon how much the poet wished to flatter his patron.

There are a number of texts in Hiberno-Norman French, most of them administrative (including commercial) or legal, although there are a few literary works as well. There is a large amount of parliamentary legislation, including the famous Statute of Kilkenny and municipal documents.

The major literary text is The Song of Dermot and the Earl, a chanson de geste of 3,458 lines of verse concerning Dermot McMurrough and Richard de Clare, 2nd Earl of Pembroke (known as "Strongbow"). Other texts include the Walling of New Ross composed about 1275, and early 14th century poems about the customs of Waterford.

See also

 The Deeds of the Normans in Ireland
 Later Medieval Ireland (1185 to 1284)
 Tribes of Galway
 Irish nobility
 Norman Ireland
Normans elsewhere
 Italo-Norman
 Scoto-Norman

References

Further reading
 

 
 
Ireland
Lordship of Ireland
Ethnic groups in Ireland